The curve-billed reedhaunter (Limnornis curvirostris) is a species of bird in the ovenbird family Furnariidae. It is found in marshy areas of north-eastern Argentina, south-eastern Brazil, and Uruguay. It occupies a similar ecological niche to some reed warblers.

The curve-billed reedhaunter is placed in the monotypic genus Limnornis. The superficially similar straight-billed reedhaunter is sometimes also included in Limnornis, but evidence suggests it is closer to Cranioleuca spinetails than it is to the curve-billed reedhaunter.

Within the ovenbird family, the curve-billed reedhaunter is genetically most closely related to the wren-like rushbird (Phleocryptes melanops). The curve-billed reedhaunter is monotypic: no subspecies are recognised.

References

 Gould, John (1839): [Genus Limnornis]. In: Zoology of the Voyage of the H.M.S. Beagle. Part III: Birds. 11: 80.

curve-billed reedhaunter
Birds of the Pampas
Birds of Uruguay
curve-billed reedhaunter
Taxonomy articles created by Polbot